Indigenous science is the application and intersection of Indigenous knowledge and science. In ecology this is sometimes termed traditional ecological knowledge. Indigenous science is a holistic understanding of an Indigenous Nations territory or place. It follows the same methods of Western science including (but not limited to): observation, prediction, interpretation, questioning, etc...

Traditional and scientific

Indigenous knowledge and experiences have traditionally been passed down orally from generation to generation. The concept of Indigenous science promotes the idea that every culture has its own science and understanding of the world. This point of view has been employed by scientists and policy makers to adopt new paradigms for the interpretation and human management of natural processes. While there are differences in the use of and structure between Indigenous science and scientific knowledge, Indigenous science has an empirical basis and has traditionally been used to predict and understand the world.

In ecology 

Indigenous science has helped to address ecological challenges including the restoration of salmon, management of seabird harvests, outbreaks of hantavirus, and addressing wildfires.

In other sciences 

Climatology studies have made use of traditional knowledge (Qaujimajatuqangit) among the Inuit when studying long-term changes in sea ice.

As well as in ecology, Indigenous knowledge has been used in biological areas including animal behaviour, evolution, physiology, life history, morphology, wildlife conservation, wildlife health, and taxonomy.

Indigenous science scholars 

 Nancy C. Maryboy
 Karlie Noon
 Lydia Jennings
 Ian Saem Majnep

See also

 Folk science

References

Oral tradition
History of science
Traditional knowledge
Indigenous culture